Anita O'Day: The Life of a Jazz Singer is a 2007 American documentary film about the jazz singer Anita O'Day. The documentary, directed and produced by Robbie Cavolina and Ian McCrudden, premiered at the Tribeca Film Festival in 2007 and had a limited release on August 15, 2008. It was nominated for Best Long Form Music Video at the 52nd Grammy Awards.

Reception 
The film has received positive reviews. It has a 100% rating on Rotten Tomatoes, with the critical consensus stating "This rich documentary chronicles the highs and lows of one of the medium's finest singers, utilizing remarkable archive footage and insightful interviews with O'Day herself."

External links
 
 
 Review at The New York Times
 Review at Tokin Woman.

2007 films
American documentary films
2000s English-language films
Documentary films about women in music
Documentary films about jazz music and musicians
Documentary films about singers
2007 documentary films
2000s American films